Arkansas Highway 286 (AR 286 and Hwy. 286) is an east–west state highway in Faulkner County, Arkansas. The route of  runs from Interstate 40/US 65 and US 65 Business in Conway east to Saltillo.

Route description
The route begins at US 65 Business at the west end of an interchange with Interstate 40/US 65. Running west on the overpass, Highway 286 becomes Dave Ward Drive before winding along the northern edge of Lake Conway. The highway continues east to terminate at the unincorporated community of Saltillo.

Major intersections

References 

286
Transportation in Faulkner County, Arkansas
Conway, Arkansas